The Key to Joy Is Disobedience was a box set released by the group Coil. It contains the following releases: Live Four, Live Three, Live Two, Live One, ANS, and Megalithomania!.

Background
The set is often incorrectly referred to as "Live Box". Upon its release, the set cost just under $200. Other than CDs, the set contains four art prints, one of which is signed and one of which contains an actual drawing. A list of beast boxes is included as well. A black glass disc and a clear glass disc are also included, supposedly for scrying use. The set is sealed with a sticker that must be broken in order to access its contents.

The box set's title is based on a line from Aleister Crowley's "Hymn to Lucifer": "The Key of Joy is disobedience."

Edition
This box set is limited to an edition of 100 normal copies and 23 special copies, which are subtitled "Beast Box". These so-called "beast boxes" each have their own individual titles. The titles are as follows:

lipstick eyes meat
arse doctor lense haircut
spilt guilt
decadent + symmetrical
fear of the bee means the honey is for me
why is a mouse when it spins
it just is
lake big nay ions lays
feral evidence animal reverence
jhonn balance
when sycophancy was in its infancy
we cure the unacceptable
animals dream differently in winter
offending team north division
the word that light unites is space
a bigger bucket
sipping birdsong through bedsprings
they all told lies beautifully
a murder of crows
extraterrestrial antelope
the one yew bury

The "beast boxes" were hand decorated by John Balance as well as a few other known Coil acquaintances.

In Pop Culture
In 2022, indie rock artist Ariel Pink released an album entitled "The Key of Joy Is Disobedience" with the project Ariel Pink's Dark Side.

References

External links
 
 
 Live Box at Brainwashed

2003 compilation albums
Coil (band) compilation albums